The 1968 Memorial Cup  was the 50th annual Memorial Cup competition, organized by the Canadian Amateur Hockey Association (CAHA) to determine the champion of junior A ice hockey. The George Richardson Memorial Trophy champions Niagara Falls Flyers of the Ontario Hockey Association in Eastern Canada competed against the Abbott Cup champions Estevan Bruins of the Western Canada Junior Hockey League in Western Canada. In a best-of-seven series, held at the Niagara Falls Memorial Arena in Niagara Falls, Ontario and at the Montreal Forum in Montreal, Quebec, Niagara Falls won their 2nd Memorial Cup, defeating Estevan 4 games to 1.

CAHA vice-president Lloyd Pollock oversaw the schedule, and used the Montreal Forum to increase profits for CAHA, since Maple Leaf Gardens was not available and due to the smaller size of the Niagara Falls Memorial Arena.

Scores
Game 1: Niagara Falls 7-4 Estevan
Game 2: Estevan 4-2 Niagara Falls (in Montreal)
Game 3: Niagara Falls 7-4 Estevan
Game 4: Niagara Falls 4-3 Estevan (2OT)
Game 5: Niagara Falls 6-0 Estevan

Winning roster
Steve Atkinson, Doug Brindley, Russ Frieson, Karl Haggarty, Doug Keeler, Mike Keeler, Rick Ley, Don Makey, Phil Myre, Jim Notman, Phil Roberto, Ron Schwindt, Brad Selwood, Garry Swain, Don Tannahill, Dave Tataryn, Rick Thompson, Ross Webley, Tom Webster. Coach: Paul Emms

National Playoff Tree

Additional Interleague Playdowns
Halifax Canadiens defeated Fredericton Red Wings 4-games-to-2 (Atlantic Canada Final)
Fort William Westfort Hurricanes defeated Nip-Rock Rangers 3-games-to-none (Northwestern Ontario Final)
Verdun Maple Leafs defeated Chicoutimi Saguenéens 3-games-to-1 (Quebec SF)
Verdun Maple Leafs defeated Drummondville Rangers 3-games-to-1 (Quebec Final)

Roll of League Champions

Western Canada - Abbott Cup playdowns
British Columbia (BC)
BCJHL: Penticton Broncos
Alberta (AB)
AJHL: Edmonton Movers
Saskatchewan (SK)
WCHL: Estevan Bruins
Manitoba (MB)
MJHL: St. James Canadians
Northwestern Ontario (NWO)
NWOJHL: Nip-Rock Rangers
TBJHL: Fort William Westfort Hurricanes

Eastern Canada - George Richardson Memorial Trophy playdowns
Ontario (ON)
Eastern Ontario (EO) - CJHL: Cornwall Royals
Northeastern Ontario (NEO) - NOJHA: North Bay Trappers
Southern Ontario (SO) - OHA: Niagara Falls Flyers
Quebec (QC)
LHJP: Drummondville Rangers
LHJSLS: Chicoutimi Saguenéens
LHJMM: Verdun Maple Leafs
Atlantic Canada (AC)
New Brunswick - Fredericton Red Wings (Independent)
Nova Scotia - Halifax Canadiens (Independent)

References

External links
 Memorial Cup 
 Canadian Hockey League

Mem
Memorial Cup tournaments
Ice hockey competitions in Montreal
Sport in Niagara Falls, Ontario